Rani Kalindi (died 1873 CE) was the 46th and last independent ruler of the Chakma Circle. She was only female ruler of the Chakma people.

She was born in the village of Kudukchari near the Rangamati-Khagrachari highway in present-day Chittagong Hill Tracts region of Bangladesh and was the daughter of a commoner called "Guzong Bujjye" which literally means "bent old man" translated from the Chakma language. She sided with the East India Company during the Indian mutiny. She supported the British Raj in its war against Lushais people during Lushai Expedition.

Raja Dharam Bux Khan married her.

After his death she became the reigning Rani after a brief power struggle with rival queens and the estate manager called Shuklal Dewan backed by Captain Thomas Herbert Lewin the British Superintendent of Chittagong Hill Tracts district.

Achievements

She institutionalized and patronized Theravada Buddhism in the kingdom by inviting monks from Myanmar.

During her time the Rajbari was at Rajanagar, Rangunia now in Chittagong District.

Death

She died in 1873 leaving her step-grandson Harish Chandra to be the next Chakma Raja in her place.

References

Chakma people
Buddhist monarchs
Chakma Royal Family
1873 deaths